Strasburg is a borough in Lancaster County, Pennsylvania. It developed as a linear village stretching about  along the Great Conestoga Road, later known as the Strasburg Road. The population was 3,117 at the 2020 census.
 
The town was named after the French city of Strasbourg, the native home of an early settler.
The town is often called "Train Town USA" because of the many railroad attractions in and around town, including the Strasburg Rail Road and the Railroad Museum of Pennsylvania. Much of the movie Witness was filmed on a farm nearby. Much of the borough was listed as a historic district by the National Register of Historic Places in 1983.

History

The Old Conestoga Road was in use by 1714, and by 1750 a tavern and some log houses were built near the current site of Strasburg. The community grew as regional trade with Philadelphia grew. By 1759, there were 32 taxable properties in the town, including about ten hotels. Many early settlers were Huguenots or Swiss or German Mennonites, and several church congregations of various faiths formed during the 1760s. The first church was built in 1807 by Methodists.

The Old Conestoga Road was the main path connecting Philadelphia with areas to the west, but in 1792 the new Philadelphia and Lancaster Turnpike was built, bypassing Strasburg  to the north. However, in 1793 construction on the new Strasburg Road started, roughly following the old road, passing through West Chester on the way to Philadelphia. It attracted traffic because it was not a toll road, unlike the Philadelphia Turnpike. This road later developed into Pennsylvania Route 741.

By 1815, there were 90 houses in Strasburg, about half of which were two stories, indicating a relatively well-off population. There were 53 log, 29 brick, and four limestone houses. About half of the log houses survive today, as well as 12 of the brick houses and all four of the stone houses. About 150 other houses stand in the historic district, nearly all built before 1900.

Geography
Strasburg is located in central Lancaster County at  (39.982300, -76.182713). Pennsylvania Route 741 (Main Street) passes through the center of the borough, leading east  to Gap and west  to Willow Street. Pennsylvania Route 896 crosses the northeast side of Strasburg; it leads north  to U.S. Route 30 and southeast  to U.S. Route 1.

Strasburg is in the watershed of Pequea Creek, which flows southwest to the Susquehanna River.

Demographics

As of the census of 2000, there were 2,800 people, 1,110 households, and 798 families residing in the borough. There were 1,135 housing units at an average density of 1,100.2 per square mile (425.5/km2). The racial makeup of the borough was 97.64% White, 0.57% African American, 0.07% Native American, 0.86% Asian, 0.11% from other races, and 0.75% from two or more races. Hispanic or Latino of any race were 0.43% of the population.

There were 1,110 households, out of which 34.9% had children under the age of 18 living with them, 61.6% were married couples living together, 6.9% had a female householder with no husband present, and 28.1% were non-families. 23.7% of all households were made up of individuals, and 9.0% had someone living alone who was 65 years of age or older. The average household size was 2.52 and the average family size was 3.02.

In the borough the population was spread out, with 25.9% under the age of 18, 7.7% from 18 to 24, 30.6% from 25 to 44, 22.3% from 45 to 64, and 13.5% who were 65 years of age or older. The median age was 36 years. For every 100 females there were 92.4 males. For every 100 females age 18 and over, there were 90.5 males.

The median income for a household in the borough was $47,821, and the median income for a family was $56,829. Males had a median income of $38,946 versus $26,424 for females. The per capita income for the borough was $23,346. About 2.0% of families and 3.2% of the population were below the poverty line, including 5.0% of those under age 18 and 3.5% of those age 65 or over.

Fire department
The borough of Strasburg is protected by the Strasburg Volunteer Fire Company, Lancaster County Fire Company #5-10, Zone 5. The volunteer fire department is located at 203 Franklin Street in a brand new four-garage-bay facility. The volunteer fire department operates a fleet of one rescue engine, one engine, one quint, one tanker, and one squad.

Notable people
John Alexander Ahl (1813–1882), congressman
David Craighead (1924–2012), organist
Matt Feiler (born 1992), football player for Los Angeles Chargers
Don Wert (born 1938), baseball player for 1968 World Series champion Detroit Tigers

Education 
The borough is in the Lampeter-Strasburg School District.

Attractions 
 Strasburg Rail Road
 Choo Choo Barn
 National Toy Train Museum
 Railroad Museum of Pennsylvania
 Sight & Sound Theatres

Gallery

See also
 National Register of Historic Places listings in Lancaster County, Pennsylvania

References

External links
 
 Strasburg Heritage Society
 Local Directory

Populated places established in 1733
Houses on the National Register of Historic Places in Pennsylvania
Georgian architecture in Pennsylvania
Federal architecture in Pennsylvania
Boroughs in Lancaster County, Pennsylvania
1733 establishments in Pennsylvania
Houses in Lancaster County, Pennsylvania
Historic districts on the National Register of Historic Places in Pennsylvania
National Register of Historic Places in Lancaster County, Pennsylvania